Adriel is a biblical nobleman in the ancient kingdom of Israel.

Adriel may also refer to:

Adriel (name), given name
Adriel (footballer, born 1997), Adriel Tadeu Ferreira da Silva, Brazilian football defender
Adriel (footballer, born 2001), Adriel Vasconcelos Ramos, Brazilian football goalkeeper